Ernest Zobole (25 April 1927 – 27 November 1999) was a Welsh painter and art teacher. Zobole's paintings, originally oil on canvas, later switching to oil on board, reflected the industrial setting of the Rhondda Valleys. A member of the Rhondda Group, a circle of artists from the area, Zobole is seen as one of Wales' "most important artists...one of the visionary artists of Wales".

Early history
Zobole was born in the village of Ystrad, Rhondda, in 1927, to Italian immigrants who had moved to Wales in 1910. He was educated at Porth Grammar School, before spending five years training at the Cardiff College of Art. His time at Cardiff College was notable for the daily commute from the Valleys to Cardiff, as it was used as an opportunity for Zobole and five fellow students to discuss and critique their art work. Although the six artists never set up a school or published a manifesto, they became known as the Rhondda Group and were an important movement in South Wales art.

After leaving Cardiff College, he undertook his service for the British Army, being posted to Palestine and Egypt. On his return from military service he returned to the Rhondda and married his childhood sweetheart, Christina Baker. With little opportunities to find work as an artist, Zobole took up an art teaching post in Llangefni in Anglesey, a position he held from 1953 to 1958. He found this period difficult, he found the flat landscapes dull and uninspiring and described the island as "all wind and chapel". Zobole also felt apart from the community, a mixture of his inability to speak the Welsh language; which was not a factor in the mainly English speaking Rhondda, and a sense of homesickness. He returned to South Wales in 1957, taking up a post at a Church in Wales school in Aberdare, located in the Cynon Valley a neighbouring valley to the Rhondda. Within two years he found employment teaching within the Rhondda, at Treorchy County Secondary School.

Zobole was one of the original members of the campaigning art group, 56 Group Wales.

As an artist
Initially Zobole painted as he had been taught at college, but by 1960 he started to experiment with his own style. He originally painted oil on canvas, but he then switched to oil on board and started to use a monochrome colours. He began using impasto, mainly applied with a palette knife. His period of work during the mid-1960s are now regarded as the most daring phase of his career. Zobole was influenced during the 1960s by expressionist refugee artists such as Heinz Koppel, who had a studio in Dowlais.

From 1963 to 1984 he became a painting lecturer at Newport Art School. In 1996, he was made an Honorary Fellow of the University of Wales, Swansea. Although Zobole lived and worked in a number of places in Wales, he spent most of his life in Ystrad, where he died in 1999.

Zobole described his ethos to painting as: "Painting is a part of my life...your breathing I suppose...it is part of what you're about...part of your thinking. It sounds a bit lofty to say that this thing called painting is the whole reason for existing, and if I say yes it is, then accept the fact that I have a lofty thought. The imagery for the work is taken from my immediate surroundings - the house, the outside landscape, and the landscape seen through doors and windows. The outside and inside come together in places. The system used in painting parallels one we use naturally, in that when we examine any situation, we look around or turn our heads, or move our eyes, or more likely, do all three. The differing viewpoints we take in help us build some kind of picture. In making use of these differing viewpoints, plan views, side elevations, end elevations and perspectives are used; eye levels vary, scale varies and emphasis varies; there is also time and memory".

The National Museum of Wales holds ten pieces of work by Zobole, including People and Ystrad Rhondda (1961) and Some Trees and Snow (1978).

Bibliography

Notes

External links

Art in Wales profile

20th-century Welsh painters
20th-century British male artists
Members of The Welsh Group
1927 births
1999 deaths
People from Ystrad
Welsh people of Italian descent
Modern painters
Alumni of Cardiff School of Art and Design
Members of the 56 Group Wales
20th-century Welsh educators
Welsh male painters
20th-century Welsh male artists